Hearts of Stone is the fifth studio album by American rock band Stoneground, released in 1978 on Warner Bros. Produced by Bob Gaudio, it marked Stoneground's return to a major label, having released their previous album, Flat Out (1976), on their own label. "Prove It" was released as the first single from Hearts of Stone.

Background and recording
Following the 1973 release of Stoneground 3, frontman Sal Valentino quit to start his own band. Cory Lerios and Steve Price left and formed a new group, Pablo Cruise. Five other band members also departed, leaving only founding member Tim Barnes and vocalist Annie Sampson. They reformed Stoneground with new additions Jo Baker (vocals), Terry Davis (guitars, vocals), Fred Webb (keyboards, vocals) and Sammy Piazza (drums). Without the backing of a major label, the band self-released an album, Flat Out, in 1976 and underwent a 250-date tour over the next year. Geoff Torrens, the band's manager, had taken demo tapes to various labels, but decided that the strategy to produce an album on their own was "the only way to open the door to a major label deal". Stoneground caught the attention of Warner Bros. Records, who connected them with Bob Gaudio to produce a new album.

The band recruited another new member, vocalist-keyboardist-writer Lenny Lee Goldsmith, for Hearts of Stone. The band recorded the album at Record Plant in Sausalito, California. "Prove It" served as the album's lead single, but album sales failed to meet expectations and the group was dropped from the label.

Track listing

Side one

Side two

Personnel
Tim Barnes – guitars, backing vocals
Jo Baker – lead and backing vocals
Terry Davis – bass, backing vocals
Lenny Lee Goldsmith – lead and backing vocals, percussion
Sammy Piazza – drums, percussion
Annie Sampson – lead and backing vocals
Fred Webb – keyboards, synthesizers, backing vocals, percussion
Bob Gaudio – keyboards, synthesizers
Jerry Peterson – saxophone
Steve Fontana - percussion

References 

1978 albums
Warner Records albums
Stoneground albums
Albums produced by Bob Gaudio